is a Japanese football player currently playing for Thespakusatsu Gunma.

Career statistics
Updated to 23 February 2019.

References

External links

Profile at Thespakusatsu Gunma

1985 births
Living people
Komazawa University alumni
Association football people from Tochigi Prefecture
Japanese footballers
J1 League players
J2 League players
J3 League players
Shonan Bellmare players
Thespakusatsu Gunma players
Association football midfielders